Christopher Malcolm (19 August 1946 – 15 February 2014) was a Scottish actor and theatrical producer. He first achieved notoriety for his role as Brad Majors in the original stage production of The Rocky Horror Show.

Early life and education 
Malcolm was born in Aberdeen and was brought up in Canada after his family emigrated to British Columbia in the late 1940s. He attended the University of British Columbia, where he worked and studied theatre.

Career 
After university, he returned to the UK and began his professional career with the Royal Shakespeare Company (1966–68). He appeared in at least ten productions and worked with directors including Peter Hall, Trevor Nunn and John Barton. Throughout the 1970s, he worked continuously in theatre and film, appearing in many Royal Court productions including the award-winning musical, The Rocky Horror Show creating the role of Brad Majors. He appeared in films including The Empire Strikes Back (as Zev Senesca, the Rebel soldier who locates and rescues the stranded Luke Skywalker and Han Solo on planet Hoth), Reds, Ragtime, Superman III, Labyrinth, and Highlander.

In 1978, Malcolm began his producing career with Pal Joey, which was successfully transferred to the West End in 1980 and was nominated for best Musical Revival in the Laurence Olivier Awards. He followed this success with the Best Comedy award in 1981 for Nell Dunn's Steaming, which went on to play for two years at the Comedy Theatre and around the world. Other productions in London included Frankie and Johnny, When I Was A Young Girl I Used To Scream And Shout, as well as five Steven Berkoff plays, including Decadence, Greek and Metamorphosis. in 1983 he appeared in Only Fools and Horses as axe murderer Charles Winters. Malcolm also played the role of the café owner in The Comic Strip's 1984 film "A Fistfull of Traveller's Cheques".

In 1990, Malcolm co-produced a new production of The Rocky Horror Show at the Piccadilly Theatre, in partnership with Howard Panter of the Ambassador Theatre Group. This Olivier nominated production went on to huge success throughout the UK, enjoying 4 nationwide tours over the next 10 years as well as many productions throughout the world. He oversaw these productions on behalf of The Rocky Horror Company Ltd, a company formed by the producers and the play's author Richard O'Brien to look after this much loved musical. The show finally reached Broadway in 2000 in a Tony Award-nominated production co-produced with Jordan Roth Productions at the Circle in the Square theatre.

Other British productions throughout this time include The Pajama Game, Footloose the Musical, and the award-winning Single Spies written by Alan Bennett which had a very successful year at the Queen's Theatre. He co-produced the world premiere of Flashdance The Musical which premiered at the Plymouth Theatre Royal in 2008, toured the UK and presented at the Shaftesbury Theatre in 2010. He had maintained his interest in acting as well, appearing on 11 episodes of  Absolutely Fabulous as Saffy's father, Justin, and in the BBC2 film, Daphne as Nelson Doubleday.

Personal life 
Malcolm lived in London with his wife Judy, an actress. They had three children, Nell, Morgan, and Marlon.

His daughter Morgan Lloyd Malcolm reported his death from cancer, aged 67, on 15 February 2014, via Twitter.

Filmography

Film

Television

References

External links 

1946 births
2014 deaths
Deaths from cancer in England
Canadian male film actors
Canadian male stage actors
Canadian male television actors
Canadian musical theatre directors
Film directors from British Columbia
Canadian television directors
Scottish male film actors
Scottish male stage actors
Scottish male television actors
Scottish film directors
Scottish television directors
Scottish emigrants to Canada
Scottish people of English descent
People from Aberdeen
Male actors from British Columbia
20th-century Canadian male actors
20th-century Canadian male musicians
20th-century Scottish male actors
20th-century Scottish musicians
21st-century Canadian male actors
21st-century Canadian male musicians
21st-century Scottish male actors
21st-century Scottish musicians
Canadian people of English descent